Carlos Giménez (born 7 May 1995) is a Venezuelan professional racing cyclist, who last rode for UCI Professional Continental team .

References

External links
 

1995 births
Living people
Venezuelan male cyclists
Sportspeople from Barquisimeto